Mũi Cà Mau National Park or National Park of Cape Cà Mau is a national park in southern Vietnam. It is located in Đất Mũi Commune, Ngọc Hiển District, in Cà Mau, the southernmost of Vietnam's provinces.

The park was established by Decision 142/2003/QĐ-TTg of the Prime Minister of Vietnam on July 14, 2003, on the basis of the natural preservation zone of Đất Mũi, a zone founded by Decision 194/CT, dated August 9, 1986.

By 2025, the plan is to replant about 150 hectares of mangroves, as part of a five-year plan to restore the forest. Mangrove trees form an important natural barrier against natural disasters and in some way protect the Mekong Delta.

The national park has great biodiversity. 26 species of mammals, 43 species of reptiles, 9 species of amphibians, 233 species of fish and 93 species of birds live here.

Location
This park is located on the southernmost tip of Vietnam's territory.

Coordinates: from N 8°32' to 8°49' and E 104°40' to 104°55'.

Total area: 41,862 ha, including:
Inland area: 15,262 ha.
Coast area: 26,600 ha.

See also
Cape Cà Mau

References

Vietnam National Parks & Reserves

National parks of Vietnam
Geography of Cà Mau province
Biosphere reserves of Vietnam
Protected areas established in 2003
2003 establishments in Vietnam
Ramsar sites in Vietnam
Tourist attractions in Cà Mau province